See also:
1960s in comics,
other events of the 1970s,
1980s in comics and the
list of years in comics


Publications: 1970 - 1971 - 1972 - 1973 - 1974 - 1975 - 1976 - 1977 - 1978 - 1979

Publications

1970

Jack Kirby leaves Marvel Comics to work for rival DC Comics. At DC, he creates the Fourth World mythology, introducing many new characters to the DC Universe, most notably Darkseid.

Mort Weisinger retires from DC Comics after a long tenure as editor of the Superman line during the Silver Age of comic books. He is succeeded by his longtime friend, Julius Schwartz.

Marvel Comics adapts Robert E. Howard's Conan the Barbarian into a series written by Roy Thomas.

1971

1972

1973

1974

1975

1976

1977

1978

Cancelled Comic Cavalcade is a publication reproduced in the offices of DC Comics in very limited quantity following the "DC Implosion" in 1978 that features material  originally intended for series that were abruptly cancelled.

1979

See also
Cancelled Comic Cavalcade
DC Implosion
Howard the Duck
Steve Gerber
1980s in comics
other events of the 1980s
1990s in comics
List of years in comics